Louisiana's 20th State Senate district is one of 39 districts in the Louisiana State Senate. It has been represented by Republican Mike Fesi since 2020, succeeding fellow Republican Norby Chabert.

Geography
District 20 is located in Lafourche and Terrebonne Parishes along the Gulf of Mexico, including some or all of Thibodaux, Lockport, Cut Off, Golden Meadow, Houma, Dulac, and Chauvin.

The district overlaps with Louisiana's 1st and 6th congressional districts, and with the 51st, 52nd, 53rd, 54th, and 55th districts of the Louisiana House of Representatives.

Recent election results
Louisiana uses a jungle primary system. If no candidate receives 50% in the first round of voting, when all candidates appear on the same ballot regardless of party, the top-two finishers advance to a runoff election.

2019

2015

2011

Federal and statewide results in District 20

References

Louisiana State Senate districts
Lafourche Parish, Louisiana
Terrebonne Parish, Louisiana